The 2022 Liga 3 East Java is the fifth season of Liga 3 East Java as a qualifying round for the national round of the 2022–23 Liga 3.

NZR Sumbersari are the defending champions after winning it in the 2021 season.

Teams 
2022 Liga 3 East Java was attended by 58 teams.

Name changes
 FC Maestro change its name to Sang Maestro.
 Pamekasan FC change its name to Pamekasan Putra Tri Brata.
 AFA Syailendra relocated to Pasuruan and were renamed to Pasuruan United.
 PSPK Pasuruan relocated to Jember and were renamed to PS Unmuh Jember.
 SWIs Magetan relocated to Ponorogo and were renamed to PS Hizbul Wathan Ponorogo.

References

Liga 3
Sport in East Java